Liechtenstein competed at the 2012 Summer Olympics in London, from 27 July to 12 August 2012. This was the nation's sixteenth appearance at the Olympics, excluding the 1956 Summer Olympics in Melbourne, and the 1980 Summer Olympics in Moscow because of the United States boycott.

The National Olympic Committee of Liechtenstein (German: Liechtensteinischer Olympischer Sportverband, LOS) sent a team of three athletes to the Games to compete in their respective sporting events. Marathon runner Marcel Tschopp, who competed at his second consecutive Olympics, became the oldest member of the contingent, at age 38. Liechtenstein also set a historical milestone for female athletes to participate for the first time in judo and in swimming at the Olympics. Swimmer and former Youth Olympic Games athlete Julia Hassler, who qualified for two of her freestyle events, was the youngest member of the contingent, at age 19. Meanwhile, tennis player Stephanie Vogt, who became Liechtenstein's flag bearer at the opening ceremony, had been granted a Tripartite Commission invitation from the International Tennis Federation (ITF) to compete in London.

Liechtenstein, however, has yet to win its first ever Summer Olympic medal, despite having won numerous medals at the Winter Olympics.

Athletics

Men

Swimming

Swimmers from Liechtenstein have so far achieved qualifying standards in the following events (up to a maximum of 2 swimmers in each event at the Olympic Qualifying Time (OQT), and 1 at the Olympic Selection Time (OST)):

Women

Tennis

Liechtenstein has been given a wild card.

References

Nations at the 2012 Summer Olympics
2012
2012 in Liechtenstein sport